Croatia selected its entry for the 2000 Eurovision Song Contest through the "Dora 2000" national contest, which was organised by the Croatian national broadcaster Hrvatska radiotelevizija (HRT). The winner was Goran Karan with "Kad zaspu anđeli".

Before Eurovision

Dora 2000 
The national contest was held on 19 February 2000 in Opatija, which consisted of a televised final with 26 songs. The songs were pre-selected from a public call for submissions from songwriters and composers. The winner was decided by 21 juries, 20 regional juries and a 21st jury made up of televoting results.

At Eurovision
On the night of the Contest, Goran Karan performed 17th in the running order, following Switzerland and preceding Sweden. At the end of the voting, he received 70 points, finishing in 9th place out of 24 competing countries.

The Croatian televoting awarded its 12 points to Russia.

Voting

References

External links
Dora 2000 at the Eurofest Croatia website 

2000
Countries in the Eurovision Song Contest 2000
Eurovision